"Help Me Now!" is the debut single of German synth-pop group Cetu Javu. The single was released on Deme Records, a record label set up by the band for their first release. It was a limited release, with 500 copies of the 7" vinyl and 1000 copies of the 12" vinyl. "Help Me Now!" and its B-side "Por Favor" never appeared on any subsequent releases.

Tracklisting

7" Limited Edition vinyl
GER: Deme Records DEM 215.501 S1

12" Limited Edition vinyl
GER: Deme Records DEM 215.502 M1

References

1987 songs
1987 debut singles
Cetu Javu songs